Glyphoglossus brooksii is a species of frog in the family Microhylidae. It is endemic to Borneo and found in Kalimantan (Indonesia) and Sarawak (Malaysia). Its common names are Brooks' squat frog and Brooks' burrowing frog. It is named after Mr. Cecil J. Brooks who collected the holotype "in a hole whilst prospecting" in Bidi, Sarawak.

Description
The dorsum is granulate and tan to brown in colour with a complex dark brown pattern. The belly is cream or yellow. The body is robust with short and wide head. Limbs are short and thick; the toes basally webbed, with fringes of skin seen along toes.

Glyphoglossus brooksii is a burrowing frog inhabiting the leaf litter. Its life history is poorly known. Males call during the day, during heavy showers. Eggs are relatively small and pigmented.

Habitat and conservation
Glyphoglossus brooksii occurs in lowland rainforests, mid-elevation dipterocarp forests, and heath forests. Breeding habitats are unknown but are presumably similar to its relatives, involving larval development in standing bodies of water. It is threatened by habitat loss caused by clear-cutting and leading to fragmentation of its habitat. It occurs in a number of protected areas.

References

brooksii
Endemic fauna of Borneo
Amphibians of Indonesia
Amphibians of Malaysia
Amphibians described in 1904
Taxa named by George Albert Boulenger
Taxonomy articles created by Polbot
Amphibians of Borneo